Kathiruntha Kangal is a 1962 Indian Tamil-language film directed by T. Prakash Rao. The film stars Savitri and Gemini Ganesan, the former in dual roles. It is a remake of the 1960 Bengali film Smrithi Tukku Thak, which itself was adapted from the Bengali play of the same name by Malabika Roy. The film revolves around twin sisters who get separated at birth due to circumstances, and cross paths as adults. It was released on 25 August 1962, and emerged a commercial success.

Plot 

Twin sisters Shenbagam and Lalitha get separated at birth due to poverty. Lalitha is brought up by a rich person, Panchanatha Mudaliar, and the other twin Shenbagam by their mother Kamakshi. Krishna, a doctor, comes to treat the ailing Kamakshi, and Shenbagam falls in love with him, which he is not aware of. On her deathbed, Kamakshi reveals to Shenbagam the other twin's existence. Shenbagam goes in search of Lalitha and eventually both end up travelling on the same train. An accident occurs, causing Lalitha to lose her memory and she is presumed dead. Things further escalate when Krishnan marries Shenbagam, under the assumption that she is Lalitha. Their child is born, and the real Lalitha shows up. What transpires later forms the crux of the story.

Cast 

 Savitri Ganesan as Shenbagam and Lalitha
 Gemini Ganesan as Krishnan
 M. R. Radha as Thanikachalam
 S. V. Ranga Rao as Panchanatha Mudaliar
 Pandari Bai as Balaji's sister
 Sandhya as Thilagam
 S. N. Lakshmi as Kamakshi
 Raghavan as Dr. Nair
 P. D. Sambandam
 Karikol Raju as Ulaganathan
 Balaji as Doctor
 Gopalakrishnan as Sundaram

Production 
Kathiruntha Kangal is a remake of the 1960 Bengali film Smrithi Tukku Thak, which itself was adapted from the Bengali play of the same name by Malabika Roy. The film was directed by T. Prakash Rao, produced by T. K. Ramasamy under the banner Vasumathi Pictures, and its dialogues were written by M. S. Solamalai and Maa. Raa. Cinematography was handled by Kamal Ghosh, and editing by N. M. Shankar. Shooting took place at Vijaya-Vauhini Studios in Madras, Tamil Nadu.

Soundtrack 
The soundtrack was composed by the duo Viswanathan–Ramamoorthy, with lyrics by Kannadasan.

Release and reception 
Kathiruntha Kangal was released on 25 August 1962 by Vijayasri Pictures, and emerged a commercial success. Kanthan of Kalki positively reviewed the film, calling Savitri's dual role performance it's high point.

References

External links 
 

1960s Tamil-language films
1962 films
Films based on adaptations
Films about twin sisters
Films directed by T. Prakash Rao
Films scored by Viswanathan–Ramamoorthy
Tamil remakes of Bengali films
Twins in Indian films